Wilgrove Air Park was a public use airport located nine nautical miles (17 km) east of the central business district of Charlotte, in Mecklenburg County, North Carolina, United States. Wilgrove Air Park closed permanently in 2020.

Facilities and aircraft 
It had one runway designated 17/35 with an asphalt surface measuring 2,835 by 40 feet (864 x 12 m). Its IATA code was QWG and its FAA LID was 8A6.

For the 12-month period ending September 20, 2007, the airport had 16,100 aircraft operations, an average of 44 per day: 99% general aviation and 1% military. At that time there were 50 aircraft based at this airport: 94% single-engine and 6% multi-engine.

References

External links 
 Official site
 Photos from Charlotte - Wilgrove Air Park (8A6) at Airliners.net
 Aerial photo as of 13 March 1998 from USGS The National Map
”Mint Hill Times article on closing the airpark” 

Defunct airports in North Carolina
Airports in North Carolina
Transportation in Mecklenburg County, North Carolina
Buildings and structures in Mecklenburg County, North Carolina